Eichsfeld-Wipperaue is a Verwaltungsgemeinschaft ("collective municipality") in the district Eichsfeld, in Thuringia, Germany. The seat of the Verwaltungsgemeinschaft is in Breitenworbis.

The Verwaltungsgemeinschaft Eichsfeld-Wipperaue consists of the following municipalities:

 Breitenworbis 
 Buhla 
 Gernrode 
 Haynrode
 Kirchworbis

References

Verwaltungsgemeinschaften in Thuringia